The 1996–97 Eintracht Frankfurt season was the 97th season in the club's football history. In 1996–97 the club played in the 2. Bundesliga, the second tier of German football. It was the club's 1st season in the 2. Bundesliga after being relegated from the Bundesliga for the first time.

Friendlies

Indoor soccer tournaments

Frankfurt

Essen

Koblenz

Kiel

Schwerin

Hannover

Dortmund

Munich

Competitions

2. Bundesliga

League table

Results by round

Matches

DFB-Pokal

Squad

Squad and statistics 

|}

Notes

References

Sources

External links
 Official English Eintracht website 
 German archive site
 1996–97 Bundesliga season at Fussballdaten.de 

1996–97
German football clubs 1996–97 season